Moses Brown School is an independent Quaker school located in Providence, Rhode Island, offering pre-kindergarten through secondary school classes. It was founded in 1784 by Moses Brown, a Quaker abolitionist, and is one of the oldest preparatory schools in the country. The school motto is Verum Honorem, "For The Honor of Truth," and the school song is "In the Shadow of the Elms," a reference to the large grove of elm trees that still surrounds the school.

Founder

Moses Brown (1738–1836), the school's founder and a member of the Brown family, a powerful mercantile family of New England. Brown was a pioneering advocate of abolition of slavery, co-founded Brown University, and an industrialist.

History

In 1777 a committee of New England Yearly Meeting which included Brown, took up the idea for a school to educate young Quakers in New England.
The school opened in 1784 at Portsmouth Friends Meeting House in Portsmouth on Aquidneck Island, However, in the years after the American Revolution there was a shortage of student and teachers. Four years later the Yearly Meeting decided to close the school.

During those years, Moses Brown worked to restart the school, and, as treasurer of the school fund, was able to convince the Yearly Meeting to reopen the school – in part by donating the land in Providence for the school to be built on.

The school reopened in 1819 in Providence. Moses Brown joined with his son Obadiah and his son-in-law William Almy to pay for the construction of the first building, which still serves as the main building of the school. Obadiah Brown also left $100,000 (equivalent to $ million in ) in his will to the school, a sum unheard of at the time for a school endowment or gift. In 1904 the school was renamed "Moses Brown School" to honor its benefactor and advocate. It offered an "upper" and "lower" school for "younger boys".

As the Quakers were early advocates of gender equality, Moses Brown School was a co-educational school. However, in 1926 it became a boys-only Boarding school as was the fashion for Prep School in U.S. society at the time. As attitudes again became more liberal, it again became coed in 1976. Well-known faculty over the years included the twin Quaker educators Alfred and Albert Smiley in the mid-Nineteenth Century and noted children's author Scott Corbett in the 1960s. "Moses Brown School: A History of its Third Half-Century" by Bill Paxton, covers the school's history during the period 1919–1969.

The school transitioned to a private day school in the 1980s. 

 the school was owned by New England Yearly Meeting, with its own Board of Overseers, and operated independently of the yearly meeting. The school was examining the possibility of changing its specific affiliation while still retaining its identity as a Quaker school.

Academics

Ninth and tenth grade students are offered limited flexibility in their courses, aiming to expose them to a varied selection of topics. English is the only subject mandated through four years in the Upper School. Students must study a single language for three years, and lab sciences for two. There is a requirement for a comparative religions class. Students are also required to take a minimum of two semesters of fine art courses. Students are required to participate in varied school activities whether athletic, theater, dance or community service.

In popular culture
In the 1960's, Moses Brown's Field House was the testing ground for what became known as AstroTurf. 

The school briefly made headlines during the January 2015 nor'easter when Headmaster Matt Glendinning released a music video called "School Is Closed", in which he parodied "Let It Go" from Frozen.

The school is mentioned in H. P. Lovecraft's novella The Case of Charles Dexter Ward as the alma mater of the titular villain.

Facilities

 Collis Science Center – Upper School science complex on the ground floor of Friends Hall.
 Dwares Family Student Center 
 Hoffman House and Lubrano Science Classroom 
 Fischer Ricci Family Instrumental Music Center 
 Waughtel-Howe Field House
  Gorgi Family Squash and Education Center
 Campanella Field 
 Milot Field – Athletic fields belonging to Moses Brown School in Rehoboth, Massachusetts.
 Woodman Center – performing arts facility, connected to the current library by a sky bridge. It was designed by DBVW Architects.

Alumni

 Robert Aldrich, acclaimed film director
 Prudence Crandall, state heroine of Connecticut
 Buddy Cianci, former Providence Mayor, politician, radio host, and convicted felon.
Willem Van Lancker (class of 2006), entrepreneur and product designer.
 Dean Woodman (class of 1946), philanthropist and investor.
 Jesse Williams (class of 1998), actor, director, producer and activist

See also
 National Register of Historic Places listings in Providence, Rhode Island
 List of high schools in Rhode Island

References

External links

 
 GreatSchools

Educational institutions established in 1784
1784 establishments in Rhode Island
Quaker schools in Rhode Island
School buildings on the National Register of Historic Places in Rhode Island
High schools in Providence, Rhode Island
Private high schools in Rhode Island
Private middle schools in Rhode Island
Preparatory schools in Rhode Island
Historic American Buildings Survey in Rhode Island
National Register of Historic Places in Providence, Rhode Island